Weingaertneriella is a genus of flies in the family Tachinidae.

Species
W. longiseta (van der Wulp, 1881)

References

Diptera of Asia
Exoristinae
Tachinidae genera